1945 is a 2017 Hungarian drama film directed by Ferenc Török and co-written by Török and Gábor T. Szántó. It concerns two Jewish survivors of the Holocaust who arrive in a Hungarian village in August 1945, and the paranoid reactions of the villagers, some of whom fear that these and other Jews are coming to reclaim Jewish property.

The film was screened in the Panorama section at the 67th Berlin International Film Festival and was awarded the 3rd place prize in the Panorama Audience Award.

Cast 
  as Mr. István
  as Mr. Árpád
 Tamás Szabó Kimmel as Jancsi
 Dóra Sztarenki as Kisrózsi
 Ági Szirtes as Mrs. Kustár
 József Szarvas as Kustár András
 Eszter Nagy-Kálózy as Mrs. Szentes
 Iván Angelusz as Sámuel Hermann
 Marcell Nagy as Sámuel's son
 János Derzsi as War veteran

Reception
On review aggregator website Rotten Tomatoes, the film holds an approval rating of 97%, based on 67 reviews, and an average rating of 7.7/10. The website's critical consensus reads, "1945 sifts through the aftermath of the Holocaust to offer a sober, well-crafted look at a variety of weighty themes." On Metacritic, the film has a weighted average score of 73 out of 100, based on 13 critics, indicating "generally favorable reviews".

References

External links
 
 
 
 

2017 films
2017 independent films
2017 drama films
2010s historical drama films
Hungarian historical drama films
Hungarian black-and-white films
Films about the aftermath of the Holocaust
Hungarian independent films
2010s Hungarian-language films
Hungarian World War II films
Hungarian war drama films